Gradež may refer to

 the Slovene name for Grado, Italy, a town in the north-eastern Italian region of Friuli-Venezia Giulia
Gradež, Velike Lašče, a settlement in the Velike Lašče municipality in Slovenia